Cyclocephalini is a tribe of scarab beetles in the family Scarabaeidae.

Genera
 Acrobolbia
 Ancognatha Erichson, 1847
 Arriguttia
 Aspidolea
 Augoderia
 Chalepides
 Cyclocephala Dejean, 1821 (masked chafers)
 Dyscinetus Harold, 1869 (rice beetles)
 Erioscelis
 Harposcelis
 Mimeoma
 Peltonotus
 Ruteloryctes
 Stenocrates
 Surutu

References

 Bouchard, P., Y. Bousquet, A. Davies, M. Alonso-Zarazaga, J. Lawrence, C. Lyal, A. Newton, et al. (2011). "Family-group names in Coleoptera (Insecta)". ZooKeys, vol. 88, 1–972.

Further reading

 Arnett, R.H. Jr., M. C. Thomas, P. E. Skelley and J. H. Frank. (eds.). (2002). American Beetles, Volume II: Polyphaga: Scarabaeoidea through Curculionoidea. CRC Press LLC, Boca Raton, FL.
 
 Richard E. White. (1983). Peterson Field Guides: Beetles. Houghton Mifflin Company.

Dynastinae